Allan Alexander Globensky (born April 17, 1951) is a Canadian former professional ice hockey player who played in the World Hockey Association (WHA). Globensky played parts of three WHA seasons with the Quebec Nordiques. He was selected in the sixth round of the 1971 NHL Amateur Draft by the Minnesota North Stars.

Globensky has long been an outspoken critic of fighting in hockey. His book, A Little Knock Won't Hurt Ya: My Life as a Hockey Enforcer, written with Rob Kennedy and Terry Scott, details the impact fighting had on Allan's life and health. It was released in October  2019.

Career statistics

References

External links

1951 births
Binghamton Dusters players
Canadian ice hockey defencemen
Living people
Lukko players
Maine Nordiques players
Minnesota North Stars draft picks
Montreal Junior Canadiens players
Muskegon Mohawks players
Port Huron Wings players
Quebec Nordiques (WHA) players
Ice hockey people from Montreal
Canadian expatriate ice hockey players in Finland